Terrence Anthony "Terry" Evanshen (born June 13, 1944) is a motivational speaker and former star receiver in the Canadian Football League.

CFL
Drafted by the Montreal Alouettes, Terry went on to have an outstanding career in the CFL playing for 13 years from 1965–1978, with the Montreal Alouettes, the Calgary Stampeders, the Hamilton Tiger-Cats, and the Toronto Argonauts playing in nearly 200 games and scoring over 90 touchdowns.

Terry won the Gruen Trophy as the Eastern Rookie of the Year in 1965, the Most Outstanding Canadian Award in 1967 and 1971, was an all star 7 times, won the Grey Cup in 1970 and was inducted into the Canadian Football Hall of Fame in 1984.

In 1994, the CFL instituted the Terry Evanshen Trophy which is awarded annually to the Outstanding Player in the East Division.

Post-football car crash and memory loss
On July 4, 1988, Terry's life was nearly ended when a car ran a red light crashing into his Jeep. His injuries were so serious that a priest was called to perform last rites. Against great odds, he survived in a coma, but when he awoke a month later he had no memory of his life before the crash. His struggles with this great loss eventually led him to become a motivational speaker. In the year 2000, author June Callwood wrote an award-winning book, The Man Who Lost Himself: The Terry Evanshen Story, which was turned into a 2005 movie for CTV, The Stranger I Married (also known as The Man Who Lost Himself), starring David James Elliott and Wendy Crewson and directed by Helen Shaver.

Videos

References

External links
Official website
CFL Legends: Terry Evanshen
W-Five: Terry Evanshen, a life forgotten
Speakers.ca page
Toronto Argonauts tribute page
The Man Who Lost Himself at IMDB
Ontario Brain & Injury Association survivor profile 

1944 births
Living people
Anglophone Quebec people
Calgary Stampeders players
Canadian Football Hall of Fame inductees
Canadian Football League announcers
Canadian Football League Most Outstanding Canadian Award winners
Canadian Football League Rookie of the Year Award winners
Canadian football wide receivers
Canadian motivational speakers
Hamilton Tiger-Cats players
Montreal Alouettes players
Players of Canadian football from Quebec
Canadian football people from Montreal
Toronto Argonauts players
Utah State Aggies football players